The Tarim oil fields are oil fields found in the Tarim Basin or the Taklamakan Desert in Xinjiang Uyghur Autonomous Region in China. The development of these oil fields was begun in the 1980s, and, with the completion of the transportation infrastructure, such as  Tarim Desert Highway, their total oil output reached 5.000 million tons in 2002, and was the sixth largest oil field of China at that time. PetroChina's Tarim oil fields operations are headquartered in Korla.

The Tarim oil fields are one of Xinjiang's three largest oil fields, the other two being Jungar and Tuha. Tarim includes:
Tahe oil field
Tazhong oil field

See also

List of oil fields
China Western Development
West–East Gas Pipeline

References

External links

Oil fields in China
Xinjiang
Tarim basin